Andronica Island (Angiidaak in Aleut) is one of the Shumagin Islands in the Gulf of Alaska south of the Alaska Peninsula in Aleutians East Borough of Alaska, United States. It lies east of Popof Island, southeast of Korovin Island, and northwest of Nagai Island. The island has a land area of 14.661 km2 (5.6607 sq mi) and is uninhabited.

References
Andronica Island: Block 3001, Census Tract 1, Aleutians East Borough, Alaska United States Census Bureau

Shumagin Islands
Uninhabited islands of Alaska
Islands of Alaska
Islands of Aleutians East Borough, Alaska